Robin Chan is a retired Malaysian-American soccer player who coaches the Florida Institute of Technology men's soccer team.  He played professionally in the USISL.

Player
Although born in Malaysia, Chan grew up in Walton-on-Thames in England.  In 1987, he moved to the United States and entered the Florida Institute of Technology where he played on the men's soccer team from 1987 to 1990.  In 1988, the Panthers won the NCAA Men's Division II Soccer Championship while Chan was named the tournament Offensive MPV.  Chan was a 1990 Second Team NCAA Division II All American.  He graduated with a bachelor's degree in 1991. and is a member of the Florida Tech Athletic Hall of Fame.  In 2008, Chan was inducted into the Sunshine State Conference Hall of Fame.

Professional
In 1992, he signed with the Orlando Lions of the USISL.  He was a 1992 First Team USISL All Star.  In 1994, he signed with the Cocoa Expos.  In 1997, he played for the Carolina Dynamo of the USISL A-League which finished runner-up in the championship game.  In 1998, he returned to Florida to join the Orlando Nighthawks.  He returned to the Expos by at least 2003 and played through the 2005 season.

Coach
Chan began his coaching career with the Melbourne Central Catholic High School where he took the boys' team to the 1998 and 2003 State championships.  In 2006, he became the head coach of the Florida Tech men's team.

References

External links
 Florida Tech: Robin Chan

1968 births
Living people
Florida Tech Panthers men's soccer players
Malaysian emigrants to the United Kingdom
British emigrants to the United States
American soccer coaches
American soccer players
North Carolina Fusion U23 players
Cocoa Expos players
Orlando Lions (1992–1996) players
Virginia Beach Mariners players
USISL players
People who lost Malaysian citizenship
Association football midfielders
Association football forwards
Balestier Khalsa FC head coaches
Florida Tech Panthers men's soccer coaches
High school soccer coaches in the United States
Expatriate football managers in Singapore